The 1952 Arkansas Razorbacks football team represented the University of Arkansas in the Southwest Conference (SWC) during the 1952 college football season. In their third and final year under head coach Otis Douglas, the Razorbacks compiled a 2–8 record (1–5 against SWC opponents), finished in last place in the SWC, and were outscored by their opponents by a combined total of 282 to 166.

Schedule

References

Arkansas
Arkansas Razorbacks football seasons
Arkansas Razorbacks football